Sand Ridge is an unincorporated community along the Big Muddy River in Sand Ridge Township, Jackson County, Illinois, United States.

References

Unincorporated communities in Jackson County, Illinois
Unincorporated communities in Illinois